Bertram Charles Binning  (10 February 1909 in Medicine Hat, Alberta – 16 March 1976 in Vancouver, British Columbia), popularly known as B. C. Binning, was best known for his drawings until 1946 when he first exhibited his witty semi-abstract paintings.

Career 
In 1949, when he was teaching at the Vancouver School of Art (today's Emily Carr University of Art and Design), he was invited by Fred Lasserre, the first director of the School of Architecture at The University of British Columbia (U.B.C.) to come and teach art to the architecture students. Binning, from a family of architects, believed that art, architecture and life were intimately connected.

Binning invited Richard Neutra, one of the leading architects in the Modernism movement in California, to lecture in Vancouver in 1949 and 1953. He and his culturally aware wife Jessie (Wyllie) Binning (1906–2007) provided many opportunities in their home for artists, writers and architects to socialize.

Bert and Jessie Binning fostered close ties with the most recognized figures in art in Vancouver. They were friends with Lawren S. Harris and his wife, artist Bess Harris. Those in his academic circle of intimates from art school were Gordon A. Smith and his wife Marion Smith, Orville Fisher, Fred Amess, John Koerner, Jack Shadbolt and his wife Doris Shadbolt, Lionel Thomas, and also Bruno Bobak and his wife Molly Lamb Bobak. It was an exciting time in the world art scene too. The oppressive constraints of Victorian attitudes toward art and architecture had been thrown off. In Europe and the United States, Modernist architecture and "futuristic" urban and regional design were taking hold and Binning wanted to introduce them to British Columbia. In Binning's personal artistic practice he revealed his lifestyle. Known as an excellent draughtsman, he recorded his experiences in intricate line drawings: a detailed remembrance of an unusual hotel room, studies of peaceful-looking female figures, or an architectural drawing of a street in Vancouver. The drawings exude humour and love: a friend cutting a dog's hair or a picnic view from a high perch. Innovative and intelligent, his hospitality to students, colleagues and world figures alike made him a well-loved professor.

The paintings, internationally recognized and exhibited regularly, are composed and formal yet saturated with his leisurely weekends sailing the B.C. Coast with his wife. The nautical themes and the layered, regal, simple, ship forms portray a unique architectural style. The celebratory touches are often primary colours. The expanses of painted shapes are purely those of the coast he knew best.

Binning's monumental accomplishments on the scene of Vancouver's art and architecture placed the city on the cultural map internationally. In 1946, he helped to found the Art in Living Group, which in 1949 had a major show, Design for Living, at the Vancouver Art Gallery. In 1954, works by Binning, along with those of Paul-Émile Borduas, and Jean-Paul Riopelle represented Canada at the Venice Biennale.
His visits to Japan and personality made him an important figure in the negotiations for the Nitobe Garden at U.B.C. He founded and presided over the U.B.C. Festival of the Contemporary Arts, a mold-breaking yearly avant-garde celebration spanning the decade of the 1960s in Vancouver, at the peak of which Marshall McLuhan spoke in 1964.

Eventually he helped found the Department of Fine Art at U.B.C. and headed it. He presented many papers internationally; was on advisory boards; received innumerable grants, awards, fellowships, one-person shows and retrospective exhibitions. He became an Officer of the Order of Canada in 1971. He retired in 1974. He died in 1976.

In 1997, the Bauhaus-influenced Binning Residence Binning designed for himself in 1941 in West Vancouver was declared a National Historic Site of Canada. His widow, Jessie, surviving him by three decades, had lived and managed his legacy there until then. When Jessie died in 2007 at the age of 101, the ownership and management of the house transferred to TLC The Land Conservancy of British Columbia. In 2013 TLC ran into financial difficulties and attempted to sell the house. After a protracted legal battle, TLC was ordered by the Supreme Court of British Columbia to return the house to the Estate of Jessie Binning. In 2015, the house was purchased by Jesse Saniuk, a local philanthropist and president of Four Sails Realty Inc. The house is currently being restored by its owner.  Binning's work continues to be shown regularly in Metro Vancouver - lately at the Vancouver Art Gallery, Burnaby Art Gallery and West Vancouver Museum; and is part of The Artists4Kids Trust.

Education
Binning started his studies in 1927 at the Vancouver School of Decorative and Applied Arts (shortly to become the Vancouver School of Art) under Frederick Varley and later taught at the school. In 1938–39, he took a year's leave of his teaching duties to study in London, England under Mark Gertler, Bernard Meninsky and, most significantly, Henry Moore. Upon his return to North America, he spent a brief period studying in New York at the Art Students League.

Selected commissions
 1952: painted murals, O'Brien Advertising Centre, Vancouver
 1952/53: interior architectural composition, B.C. Electric (Dal Grauer Substation, Vancouver)
 1956: mosaic wall tile and facade colour scheme, B.C. Electric Building, Vancouver
 1958: mosaic mural, Imperial Bank of Commerce, Vancouver
 1963: colour design of Port Mann Bridge over Fraser River, B.C.

Selected collections
 Art Gallery of Ontario, Toronto
 Dalhousie University Art Gallery, Halifax
 Morris and Helen Belkin Art Gallery, University of British Columbia
 National Gallery of Canada, Ottawa
 Musée national des beaux-arts du Québec, Québec
 Robert McLaughlin Gallery, Oshawa
 University of Lethbridge Art Gallery
 Vancouver Art Gallery
 West Vancouver Museum

References

Bibliography

External links
 Binning, Bertram Charles entry in  The Canadian Encyclopedia
 B. C. Binning Exhibit at the Vancouver Art Gallery (January 13 to April 29, 2007)
 B.C. Binning fonds at the University of British Columbia Archives
Finding aid for the B.C. Binning fonds, Canadian Centre for Architecture (digitized items)
 B. C. Binning, Lethbridge College Buchanan Art Collection
 West Vancouver
 artists4kids
 Burnaby Art Gallery Presents I-Dent, Evelyn Roth & BC Binning 
 2007 B.C. Binning exhibition at Vancouver Art Gallery

20th-century Canadian painters
Canadian male painters
1909 births
1976 deaths
Canadian abstract artists
20th-century Canadian male artists